Retinoic acid receptor responder protein 3 is a protein that in humans is encoded by the RARRES3 gene.

Retinoids exert biologic effects such as potent growth inhibitory and cell differentiation activities and are used in the treatment of hyperproliferative dermatological diseases. These effects are mediated by specific nuclear receptor proteins that are members of the steroid and thyroid hormone receptor superfamily of transcriptional regulators. RARRES1, RARRES2, and RARRES3 are genes whose expression is upregulated by the synthetic retinoid tazarotene. RARRES3 is thought act as a tumor suppressor or growth regulator.

Interactions
RARRES3 has been shown to interact with RNF135.

References

Further reading